Niv Adiri, born in Kfar Vitkin, Israel, is an Academy Award-winning sound engineer.

Adiri and his fellow sound engineers won the BAFTA Award for Best Sound, and have won an Academy Award for Best Sound Mixing for the 2013 film Gravity.

References

External links

Israeli audio engineers
Living people
Best Sound Mixing Academy Award winners
Best Sound BAFTA Award winners
Year of birth missing (living people)
People from Kfar Vitkin